See also parent article Bird species new to science

This page details the bird species described as new to science in the years 2020 to 2029:

The birds, year-by-year

2020 

 Peleng fantail, Rhipidura habibiei: Frank E. Rheindt, Dewi M. Prawiradilaga, Hidayat Ashari, Suparno, Chyi Yin Gwee, Geraldine W. X. Lee, Meng Yue Wu, Nathaniel S. R. Ng. "A lost world in Wallacea: Description of a montane archipelagic avifauna". Science, 2020 DOI: 10.1126/science.aax2146
 Taliabu grasshopper warbler, Locustella portenta: Frank E. Rheindt, Dewi M. Prawiradilaga, Hidayat Ashari, Suparno, Chyi Yin Gwee, Geraldine W. X. Lee, Meng Yue Wu, Nathaniel S. R. Ng. "A lost world in Wallacea: Description of a montane archipelagic avifauna". Science, 2020 DOI: 10.1126/science.aax2146
 Taliabu myzomela, Myzomela wahe: Frank E. Rheindt, Dewi M. Prawiradilaga, Hidayat Ashari, Suparno, Chyi Yin Gwee, Geraldine W. X. Lee, Meng Yue Wu, Nathaniel S. R. Ng. "A lost world in Wallacea: Description of a montane archipelagic avifauna". Science, 2020 DOI: 10.1126/science.aax2146
 Peleng leaf warbler, Phylloscopus suaramerdu: Frank E. Rheindt, Dewi M. Prawiradilaga, Hidayat Ashari, Suparno, Chyi Yin Gwee, Geraldine W. X. Lee, Meng Yue Wu, Nathaniel S. R. Ng. "A lost world in Wallacea: Description of a montane archipelagic avifauna". Science, 2020 DOI: 10.1126/science.aax2146
 Taliabu leaf warbler, Phylloscopus emilsalimi: Frank E. Rheindt, Dewi M. Prawiradilaga, Hidayat Ashari, Suparno, Chyi Yin Gwee, Geraldine W. X. Lee, Meng Yue Wu, Nathaniel S. R. Ng. "A lost world in Wallacea: Description of a montane archipelagic avifauna". Science, 2020 DOI: 10.1126/science.aax2146
White-winged tapaculo, Scytalopus krabbei: Krabbe, Niels K.; Schulenberg, Thomas S.; Hosner, Peter A.; Rosenberg, Kenneth V.; Davis, Tristan J.; Rosenberg, Gary H.; Lane, Daniel F.; Andersen, Michael J.; Robbins, Mark B.; Cadena, Carlos Daniel; Valqui, Thomas. "Untangling cryptic diversity in the High Andes: Revision of the Scytalopus [magellanicus] complex (Rhinocryptidae) in Peru reveals three new species". The Auk. doi:10.1093/auk/ukaa003.
Jalca tapaculo, Scytalopus frankeae: Krabbe, Niels K.; Schulenberg, Thomas S.; Hosner, Peter A.; Rosenberg, Kenneth V.; Davis, Tristan J.; Rosenberg, Gary H.; Lane, Daniel F.; Andersen, Michael J.; Robbins, Mark B.; Cadena, Carlos Daniel; Valqui, Thomas. "Untangling cryptic diversity in the High Andes: Revision of the Scytalopus [magellanicus] complex (Rhinocryptidae) in Peru reveals three new species". The Auk. doi:10.1093/auk/ukaa003.
Ampay tapaculo, Scytalopus whitneyi: Krabbe, Niels K.; Schulenberg, Thomas S.; Hosner, Peter A.; Rosenberg, Kenneth V.; Davis, Tristan J.; Rosenberg, Gary H.; Lane, Daniel F.; Andersen, Michael J.; Robbins, Mark B.; Cadena, Carlos Daniel; Valqui, Thomas. "Untangling cryptic diversity in the High Andes: Revision of the Scytalopus [magellanicus] complex (Rhinocryptidae) in Peru reveals three new species". The Auk. doi:10.1093/auk/ukaa003.
Chamí antpitta Grallaria alvarezi: Morton L. Isler, R. Terry Chesser, Mark B. Robbins, Andrés M. Cuervo, Carlos Daniel Cadena and Peter A. Hosner. 2020.  Taxonomic Evaluation of the Grallaria rufula (Rufous Antpitta) Complex (Aves: Passeriformes: Grallariidae) distinguishes Sixteen Species. Zootaxa. 4817(1); 1-74. DOI: 10.11646/zootaxa.4817.1.1  
Chachapoyas antpitta Grallaria gravesi: Morton L. Isler, R. Terry Chesser, Mark B. Robbins, Andrés M. Cuervo, Carlos Daniel Cadena and Peter A. Hosner. 2020.  Taxonomic Evaluation of the Grallaria rufula (Rufous Antpitta) Complex (Aves: Passeriformes: Grallariidae) distinguishes Sixteen Species. Zootaxa. 4817(1); 1-74. DOI: 10.11646/zootaxa.4817.1.1  
O'Neill's antpitta Grallaria oneilli: Morton L. Isler, R. Terry Chesser, Mark B. Robbins, Andrés M. Cuervo, Carlos Daniel Cadena and Peter A. Hosner. 2020.  Taxonomic Evaluation of the Grallaria rufula (Rufous Antpitta) Complex (Aves: Passeriformes: Grallariidae) distinguishes Sixteen Species. Zootaxa. 4817(1); 1-74. DOI: 10.11646/zootaxa.4817.1.1  
Oxapampa antpitta Grallaria centralis: Morton L. Isler, R. Terry Chesser, Mark B. Robbins, Andrés M. Cuervo, Carlos Daniel Cadena and Peter A. Hosner. 2020.  Taxonomic Evaluation of the Grallaria rufula (Rufous Antpitta) Complex (Aves: Passeriformes: Grallariidae) distinguishes Sixteen Species. Zootaxa. 4817(1); 1-74. DOI: 10.11646/zootaxa.4817.1.1  
Ayacucho antpitta Grallaria ayacuchensis: Morton L. Isler, R. Terry Chesser, Mark B. Robbins, Andrés M. Cuervo, Carlos Daniel Cadena and Peter A. Hosner. 2020.  Taxonomic Evaluation of the Grallaria rufula (Rufous Antpitta) Complex (Aves: Passeriformes: Grallariidae) distinguishes Sixteen Species. Zootaxa. 4817(1); 1-74. DOI: 10.11646/zootaxa.4817.1.1  
Puno antpitta Grallaria sinaensis: Morton L. Isler, R. Terry Chesser, Mark B. Robbins, Andrés M. Cuervo, Carlos Daniel Cadena and Peter A. Hosner. 2020.  Taxonomic Evaluation of the Grallaria rufula (Rufous Antpitta) Complex (Aves: Passeriformes: Grallariidae) distinguishes Sixteen Species. Zootaxa. 4817(1); 1-74. DOI: 10.11646/zootaxa.4817.1.1  
South Georgia gentoo penguin Pygoscelis poncetti: Joshua Tyler, Matthew T. Bonfitto, Gemma V. Clucas, Sushma Reddy and Jane L. Younger. 2020. Morphometric and Genetic Evidence for Four Species of Gentoo Penguin. Ecology and Evolution. DOI: 10.1002/ece3.6973

2021 

 Xingu screech owl Megascops stangiae: Dantas, Sidnei M.; Weckstein, Jason D.; Bates, John; Oliveira, Joiciane N.; Catanach, Therese A.; Aleixo, Alexandre (26 March 2021). "Multi-character taxonomic review, systematics, and biogeography of the Black-capped/Tawny-bellied Screech Owl ( Megascops atricapilla - M. watsonii ) complex (Aves: Strigidae)". Zootaxa. 4949 (3): 401–444. doi:10.11646/zootaxa.4949.3.1. ISSN 1175-5334.
 Alagoas screech owl Megascops alagoensis: Dantas, Sidnei M.; Weckstein, Jason D.; Bates, John; Oliveira, Joiciane N.; Catanach, Therese A.; Aleixo, Alexandre (26 March 2021). "Multi-character taxonomic review, systematics, and biogeography of the Black-capped/Tawny-bellied Screech Owl ( Megascops atricapilla - M. watsonii ) complex (Aves: Strigidae)". Zootaxa. 4949 (3): 401–444. doi:10.11646/zootaxa.4949.3.1. ISSN 1175-5334.
Alagoas black-throated trogon Trogon muriciensis: Dickens, Jeremy Kenneth; Bitton, Pierre-Paul; Bravo, Gustavo A; Silveira, Luís Fábio (2021-03-06). "Species limits, patterns of secondary contact and a new species in the Trogon rufus complex (Aves: Trogonidae)". Zoological Journal of the Linnean Society: –169. doi:10.1093/zoolinnean/zlaa169. ISSN 0024-4082.
Kilombero cisticola Cisticola bakerorum: Jon Fjeldså, Lars Dinesen, Owen R. Davies, Martin Irestedt, Niels K. Krabbe, Louis A. Hansen and Rauri C. K. Bowie. 2021. Description of Two New Cisticola Species Endemic to the Marshes of the Kilombero Floodplain of southwestern Tanzania. Ibis. DOI: 10.1111/ibi.12971
White-tailed cisticola Cisticola anderseni: Jon Fjeldså, Lars Dinesen, Owen R. Davies, Martin Irestedt, Niels K. Krabbe, Louis A. Hansen and Rauri C. K. Bowie. 2021. Description of Two New Cisticola Species Endemic to the Marshes of the Kilombero Floodplain of southwestern Tanzania. Ibis. DOI: 10.1111/ibi.12971
Satin berrypecker Melanocharis citreola: Borja Milá, Jade Bruxaux, Guillermo Friis, Katerina Sam, Hidayat Ashari and Christophe Thébaud. 2021. A New, Undescribed Species of Melanocharis Berrypecker from western New Guinea and the Evolutionary History of the Family Melanocharitidae. Ibis. DOI: 10.1111/ibi.12981
Inti tanager Heliothraupis oneilli: Daniel F. Lane, Miguel Angel Aponte Justiniano, Ryan S. Terrill, Frank E. Rheindt, Luke B. Klicka, Gary H. Rosenberg, C. Jonathan Schmitt, Kevin J. Burns. 2021. A new genus and species of tanager (Passeriformes, Thraupidae) from the lower Yungas of western Bolivia and southern Peru. Ornithology DOI: 10.1093/ornithology/ukab059

2022 

 Subantarctic rayadito Aphrastura subantarctica: Ricardo Rozzi, Claudio S. Quilodrán, Esteban Botero-Delgadillo, Constanza Napolitano, Juan C. Torres-Mura, Omar Barroso, Ramiro D. Crego, Camila Bravo, Silvina Ippi, Verónica Quirici, Roy Mackenzie, Cristián G. Suazo, Juan Rivero-de-Aguilar, Bernard Goffinet, Bart Kempenaers, Elie Poulin & Rodrigo A. Vásquez (2022-08-26) The Subantarctic Rayadito (Aphrastura subantarctica), a new bird species on the southernmost islands of the Americas. Scientific Reports. DOI: https://doi.org/10.1038/s41598-022-17985-4 

birds
'